Torquigener paxtoni, commonly known as Paxton's toadfish, is a fish of the pufferfish family Tetraodontidae, native to Shark Bay (Western Australia).

References

External links
 Fishes of Australia : Torquigener paxtoni

Paxton's toadfish
Vertebrates of Western Australia
Marine fish of Western Australia
Paxton's toadfish